Otto of Wittelsbach may refer to:

People
Otto IV, Count of Wittelsbach (c. 1083 – 1156), father of Otto I of Wittelsbach, Duke of Bavaria
Otto I Wittelsbach, Duke of Bavaria (1117–1183)
Otto VIII, Count Palatine of Bavaria, killed in 1209, son of Count Otto VII of Wittelsbach and murderer of King Philip
Otto II Wittelsbach, Duke of Bavaria (1206–1253), Duke of Bavaria and Count Palatine of the Rhine
Otto III, Duke of Bavaria (1261–1312)
Otto IV, Duke of Lower Bavaria (1307–1334)
Otto V, Duke of Bavaria (1346–1379), also Margrave of Brandenburg as Otto VII
King Otto of Greece (1815–1867), of the House of Wittelsbach
Otto, King of Bavaria (1848–1916)

Other
Otto von Wittelsbach (play), by German playwright Joseph Marius Babo (1756–1822)